Gur Band or Gurband may refer to:
 Gurband, Hormozgan, in Hormozgan Province, Iran
 Gur Band, Razavi Khorasan, in  Razavi Khorasan Province, Iran
 Gur Band, Sistan and Baluchestan, in  Sistan and Baluchestan Province, Iran
 Gurband Rural District, in Hormozgan Province